Dimitrios Fytopoulos (born 11 February 2000) is a Greek professional footballer who plays as an attacking midfielder.

References

2000 births
Living people
Greek footballers
Super League Greece players
Panetolikos F.C. players
Doxa Drama F.C. players
Association football midfielders
Footballers from Agrinio